Unexpected Uncle is a 1941 American comedy-drama film directed by Peter Godfrey and starring Charles Coburn, Anne Shirley, and James Craig.

Cast
Anne Shirley as Kathleen Brown
James Craig as Johnny Kerrigan
Charles Coburn as Alfred Crane
Ernest Truex as Wilkins
Renee Godfrey as Carol West
Russell Gleason as Tommy Turner
Astrid Allwyn as Sara Cochran
Jed Prouty as Sanderson
Jack Briggs as Waiter (uncredited)

Reception
Upon its release, the film lost $195,000 at the box office.

References

External list
 

1941 films
1941 comedy-drama films
American comedy-drama films
American black-and-white films
Films directed by Peter Godfrey
Films shot in Florida
RKO Pictures films
Films with screenplays by Noel Langley
1940s American films
1940s English-language films